Hanna Lundqvist (born 30 September 1990) is a Swedish football forward who plays for IK Tun. She previously played for Enskede IK, Djurgården, Hammarby, Södersnäckornas BK, and Stureby FF.

References

External links 
 

1990 births
Living people
Swedish women's footballers
Djurgårdens IF Fotboll (women) players
Damallsvenskan players
Enskede IK players
Women's association football forwards